Supersonic Software Ltd. is a British video game developer based in Leamington Spa, England. It was founded by former Codemasters employee Peter Williamson.  It was acquired by Miniclip in 2021.

Games developed

References

External links
 

Video game companies of the United Kingdom
Video game development companies
Companies based in Leamington Spa
Video game companies established in 1989
British companies established in 1989
1989 establishments in England